Xi Jinping Thought on Socialism with Chinese Characteristics for a New Era, commonly abbreviated outside China as Xi Jinping Thought, is a set of policies and ideas derived from the writings and speeches of Chinese Communist Party general secretary Xi Jinping. It was first officially mentioned at the 19th National Congress of the Chinese Communist Party in 2017, in which it was incorporated into the Constitution of the Chinese Communist Party. At the First Session of the Thirteenth National People's Congress on 11 March 2018, the preamble of the Constitution of the People's Republic of China was amended to mention Xi Jinping Thought. It has been officially described by the CCP as the "Marxism of contemporary China and of the 21st century".

History and development
The first official mention of the term was at the 19th National Congress of the Chinese Communist Party having gradually been developed since 2012, when Xi became General Secretary of the Chinese Communist Party (China's paramount leader). Some news sources have stated that Xi helped create this ideology together with his close advisor Wang Huning. The first indications of Xi's platform had come out in a speech titled "Some Questions on Maintaining and Developing Socialism with Chinese Characteristics" given to the newly elected Central Committee on 5 January 2013, and was later published by Central Documents Press and the journal Qiushi.

Socialism with Chinese characteristics 

Much of Xi Jinping Thought comes from Xi's 2013 speech, which focused on Marxism–Leninism and Mao Zedong Thought, China's place in history, strategic competition with capitalist nations, and a plea to adhere to the goals of communism.

In surveying the history of China, Xi argued it is "Marxism–Leninism and Mao Zedong Thought that guided the Chinese people out of the darkness of that long night and established a New China." And, as to the future, "the consolidation and development of the socialist system will require its own long period of history... it will require the tireless struggle of generations, up to ten generations."

On the relationship with capitalist nations, Xi said, "Marx and Engels' analysis of the basic contradictions in capitalist society is not outdated, nor is the historical materialist view that capitalism is bound to die out and socialism is bound to win." Xi aimed to reinforce the Marxist–Leninist view of history, stating: "The fundamental reason why some of our comrades have weak ideals and faltering beliefs is that their views lack a firm grounding in historical materialism."

Xi showed great interest in why the Soviet Union dissolved, and how to avoid that failure in China:
Why did the Soviet Union disintegrate? Why did the Communist Party of the Soviet Union fall from power? An important reason was that the struggle in the field of ideology was extremely intense, completely negating the history of the Soviet Union, negating the history of the Communist Party of the Soviet Union, negating Lenin, negating Stalin, creating historical nihilism and confused thinking. Party organs at all levels had lost their functions, the military was no longer under Party leadership. In the end, the Communist Party of the Soviet Union, a great party, was scattered, the Soviet Union, a great socialist country, disintegrated. This is a cautionary tale!
The concepts behind Xi Jinping Thought were elaborated in Xi's The Governance of China book series, published by the Foreign Languages Press for an international audience. Volume one was published in September 2014, followed by volume two in November 2017, followed by volume three in June 2020.

Speech at the 19th Congress 
Xi first used the phrase "Thought on Socialism with Chinese Characteristics for a New Era" in his speech delivered on the opening day of the 19th Party Congress in October 2017. The Politburo Standing Committee (top decision-making body) then prepended "Xi Jinping" to the phrase, in their review of his speech. The Congress then affirmed Xi's speech as a guiding political and military ideology of the Chinese Communist Party and approved its incorporation into the constitution of the party, with unanimous support in a show of hands.

The incorporation made Xi the third Chinese leader (after Mao Zedong and Deng Xiaoping) to have their names incorporated into the list of fundamental doctrines of the CCP. This demonstrated that Xi was more influential than his two predecessors as General Secretary (Hu Jintao and Jiang Zemin). Xi promised to make China strong, propelling the country into a "new era".

Xi described his 'thought' as part of a broad framework for socialism with Chinese characteristics, a term coined by Deng Xiaoping, which sees China as in the "primary stage of socialism".

Content 
Xi Jinping Thought consists of a 14-point basic policy as follows:
 Ensuring Communist Party of China leadership over all forms of work in China.
 The Communist Party of China should take a people-centric approach for the public interest.
 The continuation of "comprehensive deepening of reforms".
 Adopting new science-based ideas for "innovative, coordinated, green, open and shared development".
 Following "socialism with Chinese characteristics" with "people as the masters of the country".
 Governing China with the Rule of Law. 
 "Practise socialist core values", including Marxism-Leninism and socialism with Chinese characteristics.
 "Improving people's livelihood and well-being is the primary goal of development".
 Coexist well with nature with "energy conservation and environmental protection" policies and "contribute to global ecological safety".
 Strengthen the national security of China.
 The Communist Party of China should have "absolute leadership over" China's People's Liberation Army.
 Promoting the one country, two systems system for Hong Kong and Macau with a future of "complete national reunification" and to follow the One-China principle and 1992 Consensus for Taiwan.
 Establish a common destiny between the Chinese people and other peoples around the world with a "peaceful international environment".
 Improve party discipline in the Communist Party of China.

Influence and reception 
In subsequent official party documentation and pronouncements by Xi's colleagues, the thought has been said to be a continuation of Marxism–Leninism, Mao Zedong Thought, Deng Xiaoping Theory, "the important thought of the Three Represents" and the Scientific Outlook on Development as part of a series of guiding ideologies that embody "Marxism adapted to Chinese conditions".

Circulating the ideas of Xi Jinping Thought began shortly after the 2017 speech, particularly to academic and cultural communities, as well as the wider Chinese public.

Finding cultural expressions for Xi Jinping Thought has also been a priority. On 27 November, more than 100 of China's top filmmakers, actors and pop stars were gathered for a day in Hangzhou to study the report of the 19th Party Congress featuring Xi Jinping Thought.

Content from Xi's 2017 speech is used in public messages, described as being 'pervasive' by a Beijing correspondent for the New York Times. A poster featuring the slogan "Chinese Dream" comes from the speech, where the phrase is used 31 times. In July 2018, the carriages of a train in Changchun Subway were decked out in red and dozens of Xi's quotes to celebrate the 97th anniversary of Chinese Communist Party. The train was described as a "highly condensed spiritual manual" of Xi Jinping Thought by the local government. In January 2019, Alibaba Group released an app called Xuexi Qiangguo for studying Xi Jinping Thought.

In education 

By the end of 2017, dozens of Chinese universities had established research institutes for Xi Jinping Thought, applying Xi's stated principle of bringing the thought into all aspects of daily life. Academics such as Jiang Shigong went on to write expositions of Xi Jinping Thought. In December 2019, Fudan University added content concerning the inculcation of teachers and students in Xi Jinping Thought into its charter, leading to protests about academic freedom among the students.

In mid-2021, the Ministry of Education announced that Xi Jinping Thought would be taught to Chinese students beginning at the primary school level.

See also 
 Mao Zedong Thought
 Deng Xiaoping Theory
 Three Represents
 Scientific Outlook on Development
 Post–Cold War era
 Core Socialist Values
 Xi Jinping's cult of personality
 Xi Jinping Thought on Diplomacy

Notes

References

Further reading

External links

Xi Jinping's Thought on Socialism with Chinese Characteristics for a New era . A course on edX by Tsinghua University

 
Xi Jinping
Ideology of the Chinese Communist Party
People's Republic of China culture
2010s establishments in China
2010s in China
Eponymous political ideologies
Contemporary Chinese philosophy
Political history of China
Types of socialism
State ideologies
Chinese nationalism
21st-century philosophy
Totalitarianism
Authoritarianism